Al-Waqt ( meaning The Time) was a Bahraini Arabic-language daily newspaper. It was published between 2006 and 2010.

History and profile
Al Waqt was first published on 21 February 2006. Khawla Mattar was among the founders of the paper which was headquartered in West Riffa.

Ibrahim Bashmi, a member of Bahrain's Shura Council, served as the editor-in-chief.

The newspaper ceased publication in May 2010 after incurring financial difficulties. In July 2012, it was revealed that Bahraini MP Osama Muhana was planning to purchase the newspaper.

The paper had a leftist-nationalist slant, and along with Al Wasat, is regarded as the only Bahraini newspaper independent of the government. Among the popular writers for the paper's opinion columns were poet Qasim Haddad, Munira Fakhro, Abdulhadi Khalaf, and Mohammed Fadhel.

References

External links 
 
 Excerpt from the paper on 18 May 2009 

2006 establishments in Bahrain
2010 disestablishments in Bahrain
Arabic-language newspapers
Defunct newspapers published in Bahrain
Publications established in 2006
Publications disestablished in 2010